The 2019 Winston–Salem Open was a men's tennis tournament played on outdoor hard courts. It was the 51st edition of the Winston-Salem Open (as successor to previous tournaments in New Haven and Long Island), and part of the ATP Tour 250 Series of the 2019 ATP Tour. It took place at Wake Forest University in Winston-Salem, North Carolina, United States, from August 18 through August 24, 2019. It was the last event on the 2019 US Open Series before the 2019 US Open.

Singles main-draw entrants

Seeds

1 Rankings are as of August 12, 2019

Other entrants
The following players received wildcards into the singles main draw:
  Tomáš Berdych
  Andy Murray
  Denis Shapovalov
  Frances Tiafoe

The following players received entry using a protected ranking into the singles main draw:
  Cedrik-Marcel Stebe
  Amir Weintraub

The following players received entry from the qualifying draw:
  Damir Džumhur
  Bjorn Fratangelo
  Marcos Giron
  Raymond Sarmiento

Withdrawals
  Nikoloz Basilashvili → replaced by  Thiago Monteiro
  Borna Ćorić → replaced by  Albert Ramos Viñolas
  Pablo Cuevas → replaced by  Tennys Sandgren
  Federico Delbonis → replaced by  Alexei Popyrin
  Hugo Dellien → replaced by  Prajnesh Gunneswaran
  Bradley Klahn → replaced by  Jaume Munar
  Jozef Kovalík → replaced by  Amir Weintraub
  Mikhail Kukushkin → replaced by  Lee Duck-hee
  Adrian Mannarino → replaced by  Denis Kudla
  Yoshihito Nishioka → replaced by  Antoine Hoang

Retirements
  Alexander Bublik ((Injury))
  Jérémy Chardy (Ankle injury)
  Filip Krajinović ((Illness))
  Feliciano López ((Unknown))
   Lloyd Harris    ((Unknown))

Doubles main-draw entrants

Seeds

1 Rankings are as of August 12, 2019

Other entrants
The following pairs received wildcards into the doubles main draw:
  Jonathan Erlich /  Leander Paes
  Nicholas Monroe /  Tennys Sandgren

The following pair received entry as alternates:
  Dan Evans /  Jonny O'Mara

Withdrawals
  Ivan Dodig

Champions

Singles

  Hubert Hurkacz def.  Benoît Paire, 6–3, 3–6, 6–3

Doubles

  Łukasz Kubot /  Marcelo Melo def.  Nicholas Monroe /  Tennys Sandgren, 6–7(6–8), 6–1, [10–3]

References

External links
Official website

2019 ATP Tour
2019 US Open Series
2019 in American tennis
2019
August 2019 sports events in the United States